Dondarlı or Dondarly may refer to:
 Dondarlı, Qubadli, Azerbaijan
 Dondarlı, Tovuz, Azerbaijan